St. Sebaldus Church (St. Sebald, Sebalduskirche) is a medieval church in Nuremberg, Germany. Along with Frauenkirche (Our Lady's Church) and St. Lorenz, it is one of the most important churches of the city, and also one of the oldest. It is located at the Albrecht-Dürer-Platz, in front of the old city hall. It takes its name from Sebaldus, an 8th-century hermit and missionary and patron saint of Nuremberg. It has been a Lutheran parish church since the Reformation.

History

The construction of the building began in 1225. the church achieved parish church status in 1255 and was completed by 1273–75. It was originally built as a Romanesque basilica with two choirs. During the 14th century several important changes to the construction were made: first the side aisles were widened and the steeples made higher (1309–1345), then the late gothic hall chancel was built (1358–1379). The two towers were added in the 15th century. In the middle 17th century galleries were added and the interior was remodelled in the Baroque fashion. The church suffered serious damage during World War II and was subsequently restored. Some of the old interior undamaged includes the Shrine of St. Sebaldus, works by Veit Stoss and the stained glass windows. In the church the famous epitaph of the Tucher family can be found.

Organ

The church had an organ by the 14th century, and another by the 15th. The main organ had been built in 1440–41 by Heinrich Traxdorf, who also built two small organs for Nuremberg's Frauenkirche. The Traxdorf organ was rebuilt in 1691. The modified case was destroyed by the Allied forces during a bombing raid on 2 January 1945.

The new 4 manual, 122 rank, 84 stop organ by Peter of Cologne was installed in 1975.

 Couplers: II/I, III/I, III/II, IV/I, IV/II, IV/III, I/P, II/P, II 4'/P, III/P, IV/P

Organists
The position of organist of St. Sebaldus was the most important one of this kind in Nuremberg, and several important composers occupied this post. Organists who worked at St. Sebaldus include the following (almost all held the post until their death, except where stated otherwise):

 1446–1450: Conrad Paumann, secretly left for Munich
 1522–1524: Hans Seber
 1564-1561: Sebald Heyden
 1567–1571: Hans Haiden
 1596–1616: Hans Christoph Haiden, dismissed for adultery
 1616–1618: Kasper Hassler
 1618–1634: Johann Staden
 1634–1658: Valentin Dretzel
 1658–1686: Paul Hainlein
 1686–1695: Georg Caspar Wecker
 1695–1706: Johann Pachelbel
 1706–1719: Johann Siegmund Richter
 1719–1764: Wilhelm Hieronymus Pachelbel (Johann's son)
 1764–1775: Cornelius Heinrich Dretzel
 1783–1810: Egidius Bauer
 1969–1991: Werner Jacob (left)

Judensau

The church features a Judensau, an antisemitic sculpture depicting Jews engaged in obscene activities with pigs. The Judensau depicts a large sow, with two Jews hanging on the teats. A third Jew is feeding the sow on the left side, while a fourth is collecting the excrement on the right. The sculpture was made in the 1380s and is placed at a height of about 7 meters on the church.

Burials
Sebaldus

References 

 Christoph Wolff. "Paumann, Conrad", Grove Music Online, ed. L. Macy, grovemusic.com (subscription access).
 Harold E. Samuel, Susan Gattuso. "Nuremberg", Grove Music Online, ed. L. Macy, grovemusic.com (subscription access).

External links 

 St. Sebald Official Site
St. Sebald at the official site of Nuremberg Includes a brief description in English
St. Sebaldus church at Archiseek.com Includes brief descriptions and photographs
Saint Sebald Church digital media archive (creative commons-licensed photos, laser scans, panoramas), data from a Christofori und Partner/CyArk/Bavarian State Department of Monuments and Sites research partnership

Antisemitism in Germany
Churches completed in 1275
Churches completed in 1379
Judensau
Sebaldus
Nuremberg Sebaldus